The pharyngeal raphe is a raphe that serves as the origin and insertion for several of the pharyngeal constrictors (thyropharyngeal part of the inferior pharyngeal constrictor muscle, middle pharyngeal constrictor muscle, superior pharyngeal constrictor muscle). Two sides of the pharyngeal wall are joined posteriorly in the midline by the raphe. Superiorly, it attaches to the pharyngeal tubercle; inferiorly, it extends to the level of vertebra C6 where it blends with the posterior wall of the esophagus.

External links
 
 
 Illustration (#32)

Human head and neck